The Kwee family is a Singaporean family that owns the Pontiac Land Group, a privately held luxury real estate developer and hotel owner based in Singapore. The Kwee brothers Kwee Liong Keng, Kwee Liong Tek, Kwee Liong Seen and Kwee Liong Phing collectively run the group.

Family overview
Henry Kwee Hian Liong (郭贤良 in Chinese), father of the Kwee brothers, was a Chinese-Indonesian textile trader and real estate developer who migrated from Yuxi Town Fuqing City, Fujian Province, China, to Singapore in 1958. He founded Kwee Inc. Pte Ltd in 1959 and the Pontiac Land Group (PLG) in 1961. Henry Kwee died in 1988.

Kwee Liong Keng is the eldest of the Kwee brothers and serves as the managing director of PLG. Kwee Liong Keng is married to Chua Lee Eng, from the Chua family that founded Cycle and Carriage. He also served as Singapore's Non-Resident Ambassador to the Republic of Poland, among other public service positions. Kwee Liong Tek is the chairman of the Group. Kwee Liong Seen and Kwee Liong Phing are both directors on the board. Both Kwee Liong Tek and Kwee Liong Seen went to college in California and are alumni of Berkeley's Haas School of Business.

The Kwee brothers via Pontiac Land Group own several luxury hotels in Singapore including Regent Singapore, Ritz-Carlton Millenia, the Conrad Centennial Singapore, and The Capella Singapore, as well as office blocks and malls, such as the Millenia Tower and the Centennial Tower. PLG also developed and manage the Camden Medical Centre.

In October 2013, the Kwee brothers agreed to provide $300 million in equity, supported by an $860 million loan from a consortium of Asian banks to enable the 53 West 53 development in New York City. This is PLG's first major foray outside of Singapore amidst the tightening property market on the island state. In the Maldives, the Kwees developed the Fari Islands archipelago, anchored by luxury hospitality brands - Capella Hotels and Resorts, Patina Hotels & Resorts and The Ritz-Carlton Hotel Company. They are also redeveloping 2 of Sydney's historic sandstone buildings into a 240-room luxury hotel.

Third generation of Kwees are represented by Evan Kwee, son of Kwee Liong Tek and maternal grandson of George Aratani. Evan Kwee is a director of Pontiac Land Group and the executive director of Capella Hotel Group, and is married to Claudia Sondakh. His older sister Melissa Kwee is a social activist and chief executive officer of the National Volunteer & Philanthropy Centre in Singapore. She is also a director on Pontiac Land Group. One of their cousins, Leland Kwee, is a director of Patina Hotels and Resorts, and investor.

Kwee Liong Keng's daughters Kwee Wei Lin and Kwee Su-Lin both hold senior positions at PLG.

According to Forbes, the Kwee family have a net worth of $5.8 billion, as of July 2019. The Kwee brothers reside in Singapore. The family support educational causes, arts and cultural causes, social causes and humanitarian causes.

References 

Living people
Singaporean businesspeople
Singaporean billionaires
Business families of Singapore
Indonesian emigrants to Singapore
Sibling quartets
Year of birth missing (living people)